Catherine Raper is an Australian diplomat who was appointed Australia's first female Ambassador to the Republic of Korea on December 16, 2020. She was Head of Post in Taipei from 2014 until 2018.

References

Australian women ambassadors
Ambassadors of Australia to South Korea
Living people
Year of birth missing (living people)
Representatives of Australia to Taiwan